Bastam (also romanized as Basṭām; also known as Busṭām and Bisṭām) is a city in and capital of the Bastam District of Shahrud County, Semnan Province, Iran. At the 2006 census, its population was 7,382, in 1,997 families.

Bastam was founded in the 6th century in the Greater Khorasan. The town is known for its Islamic monuments from the Ilkhanid period and its association with the mystic Bayazid Bastami. The Alborz are to the north of the town.

The 19th-century poet, Abbas Foroughi Bastami, lived in Bastam for a time and thence acquired its name as his own. The early Bábí leader and martyr Mullá ʻAlíy-i-Bastámí was also raised in Bastam, and was a significant figure in the Shaykhi movement and later became the first person known to have died for their allegiance to Bábism.

A tradition says that the town was founded by Vistahm, uncle of the Sasanian king Khosrau II.

The historical town of Bastam embraces the holy shrine of Mohammad Ibn Jafar Sadegh (AS), Bayazid Bastami tomb, Bayazid Monastery, Bayazid Mosque, Eljaito Iwan, Ghazan Dome, Jame Mosque, Kashaneh Tower, and Shahrokhieh School, which were built in different eras from Seljuk era (1037–1194) to Qajar period (1789–1925).

See also
Great Khorasan Road

References

External links

Bayazid Shrine Complex at ArchNet. 
Friday Mosque at ArchNet. 
Tomb Tower at ArchNet. 

Populated places in Shahrud County
Cities in Semnan Province
Populated places established in the 6th century
Qumis (region)